List of winners of the Wallace Stevens Award. Originally named for its donor Dorothea Tanning, the Wallace Stevens Award was established in 1994 and is being administered by the Academy of American Poets, to "recognize outstanding and proven mastery in the art of poetry"; it carries a prize of $100,000.  Receipt of the prize has been among the distinctions noted by the Library of Congress when the Poet Laureate of the United States is named.

"It's a very sweet award, there's no doubt about that," 2004 winner Mark Strand said. "It's so meaningful to know that you're thought well enough of by your peers that they think you deserve something like this." "

References

American poetry awards
Awards established in 1994
1994 establishments in the United States